Matija Mažuranić (1817–April 17, 1881) was a Croatian writer. He was a travelogue writer, and the brother of more noted Ivan, the writer of the well-known epic Smrt Smail-age Čengića.

He was born in Novi Vinodolski and attended a German school in his native town, where he was trained to become a blacksmith. Often he indulged into travels (Montenegro, Serbia), and exceptionally in a few occasions to Bosnia. In 1841 he was back to Novi, practicing his craft and agriculture, but also engaging in literature and cultural issues in general. In 1847 he ended up in Vienna, in 1848 again in Bosnia (in Sarajevo, at the court of Fazli-paša Šerifija). At the end of 1848, in a letter addressed to his brothers he says: "I don't know when I shall return home, for I have been, I'm afraid, created for this country. Turks are very fond of me for my prudence, they say, and rayah grows ever more trust in me, and therefrom there is no other outcome but mitre on the head or a stake in the arse". After Sarajevo, Matija went to Istanbul (though the exact dates cannot be ascertained), and according to some legends even further, to Suez and the Egypt. In 1852 Matija was back to Novi, where he settled until growing ill in 1879. He lived a secluded life until the symptoms of mind degeneration have started to show, finally dying in the sanatorium of a well-known psychiatrist Richard von Krafft-Ebing, in Feldhof near Graz, on April 17, 1881.

As a writer Mažuranić was noted for his travelogue Pogled u Bosnu. During his 1839 travels to Bosnia (from Karlovac, Sisak and Kostajnica, over Belgrade, on foot and horse, to Sarajevo, Travnik, over Romanija up to Zvornik) – Mažuranić wrote a piece which can be read both as an adventure and as a realistic account of the seen and experienced. The travelogue intermixes author's views on the relationships between the Ottoman Turks and the Bosniaks, Islam and Christianity, with accounts of the customs of everyday life, images of vizier courts of agas and pashas, but also of folk meyhanes, contemplations on everyday life, love and death.

Works
 Pogled u Bosnu, ili kratak put u onu krajinu, učinjen 1839—40. po jednom domorodcu, Zagreb, 1842
 Izabrana djela, PSHK, b. 32, Zagreb, 1965

Notes

References
 

1817 births
1881 deaths
People from Novi Vinodolski
Croatian writers
People of the Illyrian movement